Greengates School is a British-style international school located in the Balcones de San Mateo neighbourhood in Naucalpan, located north-west of Mexico City metropolitan area, in the State of Mexico. As of 2015, it has approximately 1,150 students of some 60 nationalities, derived mainly from the diplomatic and international business communities. During forms 4 and 5 (grades 9 and 10 in the American System), students study for the IGCSE (International General Certificate of Secondary Education) examinations, while in their last two years of high school (Sixth form), students prepare for the International Baccalaureate Diploma.

The school preserves the philosophy of its founding statement: "...to provide an education for students which seeks not only to impart knowledge by the means of acquiring knowledge; to develop character and personality through self-discipline and service; to equip its pupils not only to earn their living but also to live creatively and happily in the world which they must inherit".

Greengates School is nowadays regarded as more of an academic school in Mexico with satisfactory achievements in both IGCSE and IB courses.

History

Greengates School was founded by Edward Foulkes and his partner Frank Whitbourn in a house in Lomas de Chapultepec in 1951. Originally, the school had no uniform and only one school bus. Over the years, it moved several times to accommodate an increasingly larger enrolment. The school, originally meant to cater to the sons of British and Commonwealth diplomats and citizens in Mexico City, was becoming more popular with wealthy Mexicans living in Lomas de Chapultepec who sought a high standard of education for their children, which they found at Greengates.

In 1961, Foulkes left to start a new school, what would become the Edron Academy in the south-west region of the city. Henry Coelho bought his stake and began transforming the school. Soon afterwards, Andre Desouches bought Whitbourn's stake, and the Coehlo and Desouches families continue to own the majority of the school. Henry Coelho stepped down as managing director in 2007, a post he held for over 40 years, and was replaced by Dr Clarisa Desouches, university professor of sociology and the daughter of Andre Desouches.

The initial parcel of land upon which the current San Mateo campus was built was bought in 1964. The project, designed by architect Innes Webster, broke ground December 1969, with the first brick laid by HE the British Ambassador Sir Peter Hope, while Andre Desouches was headmaster. The final project was completed in 1971, although the school has undergone major renovation and expansion. A domed room, called 'The Dome", used as an alternate concert venue to the gymnasium and as the biggest examination hall, was built as a third floor on top of the science laboratories in 1997. In 2001, a further six-room expansion was made at the back of the Senior Block.

In 2010, a  plot of land was purchased at the end of the school to increase green spaces. The land underwent turfing and several picnic tables were placed on the new lawn. In addition, a huge structure designed by architect Prof Javier Senosiain, named Moctezuma's Lion was placed to the right of the lawn and was designed to integrate a piece of art with a playground.

Grade equivalence

Primary school

Kinder 1–3, as well as Junior 1, form the infant school. The Kinders finish school at 13:30, while the rest of the school ends at 14:45. They study subjects such as mathematics and English.

The primary school consists of the years Junior 2–5, and no longer follows the PYP. The International Primary Curriculum (IPC) has now been implemented at the school.

In recent years, a number of "firsts" have been achieved. For example, the first overnight trip, the first play, first "museum" show, among other major projects. In addition, the outgoing primary schoolers enjoy an "Experience Day", where they get a taste of the life in secondary school.

Secondary school

Forms I-III take part of the secondary School and offer traditional disciplines like mathematics, the sciences, music, art, French, and English.

Form IV, form V, lower VI, and upper VI are the continuation and are a part of the secondary school, equivalent to a four-year high school in the American system. The third formers choose their IGCSE subjects towards the end of the year, and concentrate on their options over the next two years, before becoming IGCSE candidates at the end of Form V (except for advanced mathematians, who take the extended IGCSE Mathematics examinations at the end of Form IV, before taking the additional mathematics papers at the end of Form V). Students are expected to sit eight to ten IGCSEs, and must pass five in order to pursue the IB at the school.

The Lower/Upper VIs study the IB. They choose six subjects according to the IB programme, and many top students opt to take four higher-level courses, as opposed to the standard three. Subjects offered at the IB level include French literature, Japanese literature, physics, biology, mathematics, computer science, economics, psychology, history etc. Other subjects, such as anthropology, film studies, and business & management, are offered based on teacher availability and demand from prospective candidates.

Events and activities
There are four school houses: Whitbourne (yellow), Foulkes (white), Brightman (blue), and Edinburgh (red). The first two are named in honour of the founders, the third after the first headmaster and the fourth in honour of Prince Philip, The Duke of Edinburgh, who visited the school at its original Lomas de Chapultepec location in 1965. Every year, pupils compete in different sports such as football, basketball, track and field events, rugby, and swimming competitions for the House Cup, which is awarded on Speech Day, the last day of school.

One of the most important annual events the school organises is the International Fair, where thousands of students, teachers, and parents from different nationalities unite to create a day filled with music, dancing, food, and culture from all around the globe. The Fair features national stands, staffed by the school's families and teachers, which offer national clothes, toys and trinkets for sale as well as the country's culinary delicacies. Some of the permanent stands include the United Kingdom, Mexico, Japan, Thailand, Brazil, Israel, Vietnam, Argentina, Poland, United States, India, South Korea, Spain, France, Sweden, and Canada. Other stands change every year, such as El Salvador, Chile, China, Denmark, Nigeria, Pakistan and Switzerland, due to the smaller presence of these countries at the school.

Recognition and accreditation

Greengates School is recognised for its students' consistent high scores on the IGCSE and IB programmes, and its graduates gaining regular acceptance into top universities all over the world such as Yale, Princeton, Stanford and UC Berkeley in the United States and Cambridge, St Andrews, Imperial and LSE in the United Kingdom, among many others.

Students also attend top universities in Mexico City like ITESM, UNAM, ITAM, Universidad Iberoamericana, Universidad Panamericana and Escuela Libre de Derecho with Medicine, Law, Economics and Business Management being the most popular career choices.

Notable alumni

Ami Dar, Founder, Idealist.org
Katie Derham (1970-), newsreader
Ana Raquel Minian, historian
 Ignacio Serricchio (1982-), actor

References

External links

 

International schools in the State of Mexico
High schools in the State of Mexico
International Baccalaureate schools in Mexico
British international schools in Mexico
Educational institutions established in 1951
Private schools in Mexico
1951 establishments in Mexico